Emanuele Tusitatino Taulol Fuamatu (born 27 October 1989) is a Samoan athlete. He competed for Samoa in shot put at the 2012 Summer Olympics where he did not advance to the final. Fuamatu competed for Australia at the 2005 IAAF World Youth Championships, 2006 IAAF World Junior Championships, and the 2008 IAAF World Junior Championships. Fuamatu was a recipient of the International Olympic Committee Solidarity Scholarship.  He holds the current Male NSW Under 16, Under 18, Under 20, and Open Shot Put Records. He is the current Oceania and Australian Champion in the Men's Shot Put. Emanuele Fuamatu won the Shot Put in the Australian Junior Championships in 2005, 2006, 2007 and 2008. His 20.54 metre effort with the 6 kg as a junior ranked him third worldwide in 2008. He attends University in Sydney, Australia, majoring in Law.

Fuamatu won silver at the 2011 Pacific Games with a throw of 18.11 metres.

Achievements

References

External links
 
Sports reference biography

Samoan male shot putters
Athletes (track and field) at the 2012 Summer Olympics
Olympic athletes of Samoa
Athletes (track and field) at the 2010 Commonwealth Games
Commonwealth Games competitors for Samoa
1989 births
Living people
Athletes from Sydney